Hammond is an unincorporated community in Carter County, Montana, United States. Its elevation is 3,711 feet.

History
The town began with a store and gas station during the construction of US 212 in the 1930s. In the 21st century, Hammond has consisted only of an active post office and a rancher's home. Three other buildings along the highway are abandoned and deteriorated beyond use. Hammond is located in the southeast corner of the state, near the Montana-Wyoming border between the unincorporated communities of Boyes and Alzada in Carter County. The area around Hammond is mostly ranchland.

Climate
According to the Köppen Climate Classification system, Hammond has a semi-arid climate, abbreviated "BSk" on climate maps.

References

Unincorporated communities in Carter County, Montana
Unincorporated communities in Montana